Bob's Burgers is an American animated sitcom created by Loren Bouchard for the Fox Broadcasting Company. The series centers on the Belcher family—parents Bob and Linda, and their children Tina, Gene, and Louise—who run a hamburger restaurant. A production between Bento Box Entertainment and 20th Television, the show has aired over 200 episodes and has been renewed for a twelfth and thirteenth season.

Throughout its run, the series has received fifteen Annie Award nominations, eleven Writers Guild of America Award nominations under the Television: Animation category, a total of six Critics' Choice Television Award nominations for Best Animated Series, and four Teen Choice Award nominations for Choice TV: Animated Show.

Additionally, the show has received ten Primetime Emmy Award nominations for Outstanding Animated Program, winning in 2014 for the episode "Mazel-Tina" and in 2017 for "Bob Actually". For their performances on Bob's Burgers, John Roberts and Kevin Kline both received nominations for the Emmy award for Outstanding Character Voice-Over Performance, losing respectively to Hank Azaria from The Simpsons and Seth MacFarlane from Family Guy.

Awards and nominations

Notes

References

External links
 

Awards
Bob's Burgers